Karim Boudiaf (born 16 September 1990) is a professional footballer who plays for Al-Duhail in the Qatar Stars League. He can play as a central defender and as a defensive midfielder. Born in France, he is naturalized to represent the Qatar national team.

Club career
On 5 September 2010, Boudiaf started for Lekhwiya in the final of the 2010 Sheikh Jassem Cup against Al-Arabi Sports Club.

International career
Boudiaf was born in France, and is of Moroccan-Algerian descent. On 22 December 2009, Boudiaf was called up to the Algerian Under-23 national team for a training camp in Algiers.

Boudiaf acquired Qatari nationality and was called up to the Qatar national football team on 13 November 2013. He was capped in an unofficial friendly exhibition match against Saudi club Al Hilal. He made his official debut for the team on 25 December in the 2014 WAFF Championship in a 1–0 win against Palestine. Boudiaf's first goal came fifteen caps in. He cancelled out a Stuart Dallas goal as Qatar drew with Northern Ireland in England.

International goals
Scores and results list Qatar's goal tally first.

Club statistics

Honours
Al-Duhail
Qatar Stars League: 2010–11, 2011–12, 2013–14, 2014–15, 2016–17, 2017–18, 2019–20
Qatar Cup: 2013, 2015, 2018
Sheikh Jassem Cup: 2015, 2016
Emir of Qatar Cup: 2016, 2018, 2019, 2022

International
Qatar
AFC Asian Cup: 2019
WAFF Championship: 2014
Gulf Cup of Nations: 2014

References

External links

 Karim Boudiaf AS Nancy-Lorraine
 Mountakhab.net - Fiches de joueurs: Karim Boudiaf
 

1990 births
Living people
Qatari footballers
Qatar international footballers
FC Lorient players
AS Nancy Lorraine players
Lekhwiya SC players
Al-Duhail SC players
Algerian footballers
Footballers from Rouen
French footballers
French sportspeople of Algerian descent
French sportspeople of Moroccan descent
Qatar Stars League players
Qatari people of Algerian descent
Qatari people of Moroccan descent
2015 AFC Asian Cup players
2019 AFC Asian Cup players
Algerian people of Moroccan descent
Moroccan people of Algerian descent
Association football defenders
Association football midfielders
Naturalised citizens of Qatar
AFC Asian Cup-winning players
2019 Copa América players
2021 CONCACAF Gold Cup players
Algeria youth international footballers
FIFA Century Club
2022 FIFA World Cup players